Rosario Ignacia Ortiz Magallón (born 1 February 1951) is a Mexican politician from the Party of the Democratic Revolution. From 2006 to 2009 she served as Deputy of the LX Legislature of the Mexican Congress representing Federal District.

References

1951 births
Living people
Politicians from Mexico City
Women members of the Chamber of Deputies (Mexico)
Members of the Chamber of Deputies (Mexico)
Party of the Democratic Revolution politicians
21st-century Mexican politicians
21st-century Mexican women politicians
Deputies of the LX Legislature of Mexico